Every Brilliant Eye is the third album by Australian rock band Died Pretty. It was released in 1990 and produced by Jeff Eyrich, whose previous production credits included The Gun Club, The Plimsouls and T Bone Burnett.

The album was recorded in Los Angeles at the close of a tour of Europe and the United States. It was the first to feature new keyboardist John Hoey (ex-X-Men, Thought Criminals and New Christs) following the departure of long-time member Frank Brunetti and bassist Steve Clark (ex-Glass), who replaced Mark Lock.

Track listing
(All songs by Brett Myers, Ron Peno except where noted)
 "Sight Unseen"  – 4:39
 "The Underbelly"– 6:24
 "Herr Godiva" – 4:19
 "Face Toward the Sun" – 5:59
 "Prayer" – 4:22
 "True Fools Fall" – 4:15
 "Whitlam Square" – 4:27
 "Rue the Day" (Ron Peno, Steve Clark) – 3:53
 "From the Dark" – 7:12

Personnel

 Brett Myers – guitar
 Ron Peno – vocals
 Steve Clark – bass
 John Hoey – keyboards
 Chris Welsh – drums, percussion

Additional personnel

 J'Anna Jacoby – violin
 Shandra Beri – backing vocals
 Gary McLaughlin – percussion
 Gonzalo Quintana III – drums

Charts

References

1990 albums
Died Pretty albums
Albums produced by Jeff Eyrich